Joe Neal may refer to:
 Joe Neal (politician), member of the Nevada Senate
 Joe Neal (footballer), English footballer

See also
 Joseph Neal, member of the South Carolina House of Representatives
 Joseph Ladd Neal, American architect
 Joe Neale, baseball player